Bennington is an American talk radio show hosted by Ron Bennington and his daughter Gail Bennington on Sirius XM Faction Talk.

History

On October 1, 2014, it was announced that Ron would be doing a new show on Fridays. Beginning October 17th, Bennington would air in the Friday 7-10AM time slot on Opie Radio, when Opie and Norton were off. The show's hashtag #Bennington trended at #2 throughout the entire initial broadcast.

Full time expansion
On April 1, 2015, Fez Whatley of the Ron and Fez show announced his retirement. Their final show aired on April 3rd, and the following week, Ron and Fez played material highlighting their career with new material in between. At the end of the show on Friday, April 10th, Ron announced that their time slot would be replaced with Bennington.

On April 20, 2015, Bennington began airing five days a week, in the 12 to 3PM time slot on Raw Dog Comedy. Additionally, they maintained their occasional Friday spot on Opie Radio.

On July 9, 2018, Bennington moved to Faction Talk 103 on Sirius XM, airing 2:00-5:00PM M-F ET.

On August 1, 2022, Bennington moved back to the 12 to 3PM time slot on Faction Talk 103 on Sirius XM.

References

External links 
 

2000s American radio programs
American comedy radio programs
Sirius XM Radio programs